Luo Fuhe (born in September 1949) is a Chinese politician, who served as the vice chairperson of the Chinese People's Political Consultative Conference.

In 2017, he criticised internet censorship in China, saying that it "hampered scientific research and economic development".

References 

1949 births
Living people
Vice Chairpersons of the National Committee of the Chinese People's Political Consultative Conference